H. V. Kershaw, also known as Harry Kershaw, (29 May 1918 – 18 April 1992) from Manchester was a British television scriptwriter and producer best known for his long association with the soap opera, Coronation Street, a programme he continued to pen scripts for until the late-1980s. His memoir, The Street Where I Live, reflects on the creation and casting of the serial, as well as its production until the early 1980s.

References

External links
 
 BFI.org

1918 births
1992 deaths
Writers from Manchester
English soap opera writers
English television writers
English television producers
Place of birth missing
20th-century English screenwriters